Gajraula  is a city and municipal board in Amroha district in the state of Uttar Pradesh, India. Gajraula is also the headquarters of Gajraula block. It is located on NH 9, a four-lane highway connecting Uttarakhand and cities such as Bareilly and Lucknow via Delhi. It is a significant industrial hub in Uttar Pradesh and home to a number of multinational corporations, including Jubliant Life Sciences, RACL Geartech, and Israeli Pharma Teva API, as well as several engineering colleges. Moradabad, Meerut, Bulandsahar, Budaun, Hapur, and Delhi NCR are among the larger nearby cities.

Geography

Demographics
As of the 2001 Census of India, Gajraula had a population of 39,826. Males constitute 53% of the population and females 47%. Gajraula has an average literacy rate of 69%, higher than the national average of 59.5%: male literacy is 74%, and female literacy is 66%.  In Gajraula, 14% of the population is under 6 years of age.

Transport
Gajraula is well connected through Indian Railways. Gajraula Railway Station is situated on Gajraula-Najibabad, Delhi-Lucknow line and all passenger trains & some of the express trains stop here. There are trains for location such as Varanasi, Allahabad, Delhi, Jaipur, Ahmedabad, Aligarh, etc.

Gajraula is very well connected through road transport. It is located on NH-9 which is also AH2. It is also connected through SH 51 which is Badaun- Haridwar Highway. Every minute there is a bus to Delhi and Bareilly.

In city the commutation takes place through eco friendly e-rickshaws and autos.

Notable people

 
 
 Saiyed Zegham Murtaza, journalist, columnist, author, blogger, documentary film maker
 Devendra Nagpal, politician, businessman
 Harish Nagpal, politician, businessman
 Pankaj Pushkar, politician, social worker

References

Cities and towns in Amroha district